Kafr Takharim Subdistrict  is a Syrian nahiyah (subdistrict) located in Harem District in Idlib.  According to the Syria Central Bureau of Statistics (CBS), Kafr Takharim Subdistrict had a population of 14772 in the 2004 census.

References 

Subdistricts of Idlib Governorate